Eveline Hasler (born 22 March 1933) is a Swiss writer. Born in Glarus, she studied Psychology and History at the University of Fribourg and worked as a teacher in St. Gallen. She has written novels (for adults) and children's books which have been translated into many languages.
Her literary estate is archived in the Swiss Literary Archives in Bern. Eveline Hasler lives in Ticino.

One of her most-read works is the novel Anna Goeldin – The Last Witch. It fictionalizes one of the last witchcraft trials in Europe and was published in 1982, at the bicentennial of the execution of Anna Göldi.

Her historical stories and novels "bring long-forgotten individuals and their experiences back to life, redressing to some extent the balance of history which has seen them marginalized or discounted." In many of her works, she reminds readers that "stability, one of the valued preserves of modern Swiss society, is a relatively recent privilege."

Flying with Wings of Wax (1991) presents the life of Emily Kempin (1853-1901), the first German-speaking female law graduate; she was refused permission to practice law in her home country of Switzerland, "sought her fortune in New York, but ultimately failed in her struggle against convention."

Bibliography (English translations only)
 Martin is Our Friend. Trans. Dorothea Desmarowitz. Abingdon, 1981.
 Winter Magic. Trans. Michele Lemieux. W. Morrow, 1984.
 Bats in the Belfry. Trans. Jozef Wilkon. Adama Books, 1984.
 The Garden Town. Trans. Stepan Zavrel; Lenore Wilson. Daan Retief, 1989.
 Flying with Wings of Wax: The Story of Emily Kempin-Spyri. Fromm International, 1993.
 The giantess. Trans. Renate Seelig. Kane/Miller Book Publishers, 1997.
 A Tale of Two Brothers. Trans. Käthi Bhend; Marianne Martens. North-South Books, 2006.  
 The Birdmaker Witch. Stories of Child Witches in Switzerland and Germany. (Excerpts) In: The Dirty Goat 25 (2011): 214–261. www.thedirtygoat.com
 Anna Goeldin – The Last Witch. Trans. Mary Bryant. Ed. Waltraud Maierhofer. Lighthouse Christian Publishing, 2013. 
 The Child Witches of Lucerne and Buchau. Trans. Waltraud Maierhofer and Jennifer Vanderbeek, 2022.

References

External links

 Literary estate of Eveline Hasler in the archive database HelveticArchives of the Swiss National Library
 Publications by and about Eveline Hasler in the catalogue Helveticat of the Swiss National Library
 
 

1933 births
Living people
20th-century Swiss novelists
Swiss women novelists
German-language writers
21st-century Swiss novelists
21st-century Swiss women writers
20th-century women writers